An Evening with John Denver is the first live album by American singer and songwriter John Denver. It was recorded at the Universal Amphitheatre in Los Angeles, California in August and September 1974. He was backed by an orchestra conducted by Lee Holdridge. Denver's manager, Milton Okun, was the album's music producer.

Track listing

Notes
 mistakenly credited as Owens B. Castleman

Personnel

Musicians
John Denver —  vocals, 6- and 12-string guitar
Dick Kniss — bass
Herb Lovelle — drums
Steve Weisberg — lead guitar, pedal steel guitar, resonator guitar
John Sommers — rhythm guitar, banjo, fiddle, mandolin
Hal Blaine — percussion

Orchestra

Lee Holdridge — conductor
Allan Harshman
Assa Drori
William Collette
David Duke
David Schwartz
David Turner
Denyse Buffum
Gene Cipriano
Harry Shlutz
Jay Rosen 
Jerome Kessler
Jesse Ehrlich
Joy Lyle
Mari Tsumura
Milton Kestenbaum
Murray Adler
Peter Mercurio
Ralph Schaeffer
Raymond Kelley
Richard Kaufman
Richard Maximoff 
Ronald Folsom
Samuel Boghossian
Sidney Sharp
Tibor Zelig
Vincent DeRosa
Wilbert Nuttycombe
William Kurasch

Production

Kris O'Connor — concert director
Milton Okun — producer
Kris O'Connor — assistant producer
Jerry Weintraub — personal management
Wally Heider Recording — recording
Ken Johnson — set designer
Penrod, Inc. — set construction
Stanal Sound — sound designer
Sundance Lighting — lighting designer
Jim Moody — lighting director
Ernie Zeilinger — engineer
Artie Torgersen — assistant engineer
Richard Simpson — mastering engineer
Mickey Crofford — recording engineer
Lowell Norman — film coordinator

Design

Nick Sangiamo — cover photography
Mike Kirkland — inner spread photography
Anthony Loew — liner photography
Sam Emerson — liner photography
Lowell Norman — liner photography
Mike Kirkland — liner photography
Nick Sangiamo — liner photography
Acy Lehman — art director
Mike Kirkland — poster artwork

Charts

Weekly charts

Year-end charts

References

John Denver albums
Albums arranged by Lee Holdridge
Albums produced by Milt Okun
1975 live albums
RCA Records live albums